Marcos Tébar Ramiro (born 7 February 1986) is a Spanish professional footballer who last  played as a midfielder for Indian Super League club Odisha FC. A product of Real Madrid's academy, he made one senior appearance for the club before departing in 2010 for spells with Girona and UD Almería.

Club career

Real Madrid
Tébar was born in Madrid. A defensive midfielder, he signed for Spanish giants Real Madrid in 1998, at the age of 12. At just 16, Tébar was included in the first team squad for a friendly versus Sevilla in September 2002, and replaced Albert Celades during the first half of a 0–1 loss. He made his senior debuts with the C-team in 2003–04, in the Tercera División, also appearing with the reserves in the same campaign.

Tébar was called up for the main squad in November 2005 by Vanderlei Luxemburgo, for a La Liga match against Real Zaragoza. He remained unused in the eventual 1–0 win, and was also on the bench in a match against Getafe CF on 3 December, before being assigned back to Castilla. On 15 January 2006 Tébar made his debut as a professional, coming on as a second-half substitute in a 1–3 loss at CD Castellón in the Segunda División.

On 18 January 2006 Tébar joined city neighbours Rayo Vallecano on loan until June. He returned to Los Merengues in June, after appearing in 17 matches during the campaign and scoring his first senior goal on 19 March, netting the first of a 2–1 home win against Universidad de Las Palmas CF.

After returning from Rayo, Tébar appeared regularly with the B-side in the following three seasons, scoring his first professional goal on 9 September 2006, but in a 1–3 loss at Deportivo Alavés. On 30 May 2009, he was called up for the main squad by manager Juande Ramos, along with Javier Velayos and Gary Kagelmacher, for the final game of 2008–09 against CA Osasuna. He made his debut in the main category of Spanish football on the following day, replacing Kagelmacher in the 58th minute of an eventual 1–2 loss at the Estadio Reyno de Navarra.

In January 2010 Tébar moved to Girona FC on loan until June. In the summer, he started pre-season with Real Madrid under new boss José Mourinho, but left the club in August.

Girona
On 25 January 2010, Tébar joined Girona FC of the Segunda División on loan until June. He made his debut for the club late in the month, starting and playing the full 90 minutes of a 1–4 loss at FC Cartagena.

On 13 August Tébar returned to the Catalans on a permanent basis for three years, being sold for a mere €100. He was an essential midfield unit during his spell with the side, scoring his first goal on 1 September 2012 in a 1–0 home win over SD Ponferradina.

Almería
On 9 July 2013 Tébar joined UD Almería, recently returned to the top flight. He played his first game in the competition in four years on 19 August, starting in a 2–3 home loss to Villarreal CF.

On 9 June 2014 Tébar rescinded his link with the Andalusians, despite contributing with 29 appearances (16 starts, 1466 minutes of action).

Brentford
On 25 June 2014, Tébar signed for English Championship side Brentford on a two-year contract, with the option for a third. He made his debut for the club on the opening day of the 2014–15 season, as a half-time substitute for Moses Odubajo in a 1–1 draw with Charlton Athletic. He made five further appearances, starting three times, before falling behind Toumani Diagouraga and Jon Toral in the pecking order in late September. A thigh injury kept him out of the first team squad in November and December, before a brief return to the bench in January 2015. Manager Mark Warburton made Tébar available for loan in mid-March, but was concerned with the player's lack of match fitness putting off prospective takers. He made just six appearances during the 2014–15 season.

Tébar appeared in Brentford's 2015–16 pre-season matches, but missed the beginning of the season with a hamstring injury. Despite not being match fit, a high amount of injuries at the club saw him win his first call into a squad for the first time in 9 months when he was an unused substitute during a 2–1 victory over Preston North End on 19 September. Tébar's contract was terminated on 19 December 2015.

Later years
On 20 December 2015, Tébar joined Segunda División side UE Llagostera on a contract effective from the beginning of the January 2016 transfer window.

On 31 August 2016, Tébar signed with Indian Super League franchise Delhi Dynamos FC. On 31 January 2017, he joined Spanish second tier club CF Reus Deportiu before returning to India with FC Pune City on 4 August 2017. On 22 November, he made his debut in a 3–2 defeat against Delhi Dynamos FC, scoring a goal in the dying minutes of the match. On 10 August 2018, he resigned for Delhi Dynamos.

Tebar joined Odisha FC and will captain the side in 2019 Hero Indian Super League.

International career
Tébar was capped for Spain at U16 and U17 level. Coming through in the same generation as Cesc Fàbregas and David Silva, Tébar was included the U17 squad for the U17 World Cup and the U17 European Championship in the summer of 2003, winning runners-up medals in both tournaments.

Career statistics

Honours
Spain U17
FIFA U-17 World Cup: Runner-up 2003
 UEFA European Under-17 Championship: Runner-up 2003

References

External links

1986 births
Living people
Footballers from Madrid
Spanish footballers
Association football midfielders
La Liga players
Segunda División players
Segunda División B players
English Football League players
Real Madrid Castilla footballers
Rayo Vallecano players
Real Madrid CF players
Girona FC players
UD Almería players
UE Costa Brava players
CF Reus Deportiu players
Brentford F.C. players
Indian Super League players
Odisha FC players
Spain youth international footballers
Spanish expatriate footballers
Spanish expatriate sportspeople in England
Spanish expatriate sportspeople in India
Expatriate footballers in England
Expatriate footballers in India